Daria Kozmova Vassilyanska (in Bulgarian Дария Козмова Василянска) (1928-2017) was a Bulgarian artist.

Biography
Daria Vassilyanska was born on 28 November 1928 in Varna, Bulgaria. She graduated from Prof.Iliya Petrov's painting class at the National Academy of Arts in Sofia in 1955.
Beginning in 1959 she took part in all national, group and regional exhibitions of the Union of the Bulgarian Artists.
Vassilyanska lived and worked in Varna. Her husband was the Bulgarian theatre director Stancho Stanchev.
She died on 4 December 2017 in Varna.
She was a free-lance artist in the sphere of easel painting, scenography, monumental-decorative murals and applied art.
Her works are owned by The National Art Gallery, Sofia City Art Gallery, Varna City Art Gallery, 22 state art galleries in Bulgaria, institutions and private collections in the country and abroad.

Solo exhibitions
1974 – "BWA" Sopot Gallery, Gdańsk, Poland
1975 – Exhibition Hall at 65 "Knyaz Boris I" – Varna 
1975 – "Lamartine" museum, the Old town of Plovdiv
1976 – Gallery of the Union of the Bulgarian Artist "Shipka 6" Sofia
1976 – Göttingen, Germany
1977 – Art Fest – Oreshak 
1998 – The Ladies, the Ladies up on Stage – "Art 36" Gallery, Sofia 
1998 – Jubilee exhibition at the Varna City Gallery 'Boris Georgiev'
1999 – Sundry Pictures, "TED" Gallery, Varna
1999 – Daria’s Cats, "Georgi Velchev" museum, Varna
2000 – Little Landscapes with the Sea, "Gallery 8", Varna
2001 – Madonnas, "Gallery 8", Varna
2001 – Grimaces and Smiles, "Georgi Velchev" Art Museum, Varna
2002 – Madonnas, "Art 36" Gallery, Sofia
2002 – Greetings, Bearers of Culture!, "Gallery 8", Varna
2003 – The Threepenny Exhibition, "Gallery 8", Varna
2004 – Seaside, "Dyakov" Gallery, Plovdiv
2004 – Old-fashioned Exhibition, "Artin" Gallery, Varna
2006 – Looking at Things More Beautiful, "Artin" Gallery, Varna
2008 – Exhibition at "Zlatyu Boyadzhiev" Museum – Old Plovdiv 
2008 – With These Ones I Feel Fine, Jubilee exhibition at the Varna City Gallery 'Boris Georgiev'
2014 – Smiles and Grimaces, at  Varna City Gallery 'Boris Georgiev'
2016 – Paper Pictures at Varna City Gallery
2016 – Daria’s Cats – Second Hand at the House of Architect in Varna
2017 – In Memoriam – Varna City Gallery "Boris Georgiev"

Participation in international exhibitions
1976                             International Biennial of Painting – Košice, Slovakia, Art Fair – Göttingen, Germany, International Triennial of Realistic Painting – Sofia 

1981,1983,1985,1989,2001,2003    International Biennial of Humour and Satire – Gabrovo 
1996                             International Triennial of Painting – Sofia
2000–2014                       Biennial of Visual Arts "August in Art" – Varna
2004                             Balkan Quadrennial of Painting "Myths and Legends of My People" – Stara Zagora

Participations in representative exhibitions of the Union of Bulgarian Artists abroad
1961 Budapest, Hungary
1967, 1973, 1979, 1984 Odessa, the Ukraine
1969 Braila, Romania; Turku, Finland
1970 Warsaw, Poland
1974 Moscow, Russia; Vichy, France
1983 Berlin, Germany
1985 Kuwait
1993 Tokyo, Japan

More significant participations in general exhibitions and competitions
1972,1974,1978 General Art Exhibition "Friends of the Sea" – Burgas
1978,1979 General Art Exhibition "The Drawing" – Sofia
1982,1985 General Art Exhibition "Small Format" – Sliven
1983 General Art Exhibition "Drawings and Figurines" – Sofia
2003 "The Jazz of Optimists" – Rayko Aleksiev Gallery, Sofia 
2005 General Art Exhibition "Portrait" – Shipka 6 Gallery, Sofia
2007 General Art Exhibition "Traffic" – Shipka 6 Gallery, Sofia
2008 Exhibition National Competition "Allianz Bulgaria" for painting, sculpture and prints.
2013 Seventh National Exhibition "Art Collages" – Plovdiv
2014 "Then and Now" – representative exhibition of 30 renowned Bulgarian painters at "Shipka 6" Gallery, Sofia
2016 Visual Chronicles/Nine Portraits 
2016 "Visual Chronicles/Nine Portraits of Painters" – Sofia City Art Gallery

Scenography
She is the author of the scenography of 10 theatre performances in the theatres of Varna and Shumen: 
1955–1956 "Funny Stories after Cervantes’ interludes, staged by Stancho Stanchev, "Vasil Drumev" Drama Theatre – city of Shumen 
1956–1957 "Cinderella" by Charles Perrault, staged by Stancho Stanchev, Puppet Theatre – city of Shumen 
1956–1957 "Father and Son" by L.S.Tirina, staged by Stancho Stanchev, "Vasil Drumev"Drama Theatre – city of Shumen 
1958–1959 Goodnight, Patricia! by Aldo De Benedetti, staged by Stancho Stanchev, "Vasil Drumev" Drama Theatre – city of Shumen 
1958–1959 "The Hunchback of Notre-Dame" by Victor Hugo, staged by Stancho Stanchev, "Vasil Drumev" Drama Theatre – city of Shumen
1958–1959 "The Phoney Civilisation" by Dobri Voynikov, staged by Stancho Stanchev, "Vasil Drumev" Drama Theatre – city of Shumen
1962–1963 "The Great Bobby" by Krzysztof Gruszczyński, staged by Stancho Stanchev, "Stoyan Bachvarov" Drama Theatre – 
city of Varna 
1962–1963 "Colleagues" by Vasiliy Aksyonov and Yuri Stabovoy, staged by Tsvetan Tsvetkov, "Stoyan Bachvarov" Drama Theatre – city of Varna
1964–1965 "So Many Poppies!" by Nikola Rusev, staged by Stancho Stanchev, "Stoyan Bachvarov"Drama Theatre – city of Varna 
1972–1973 "Seventh Commandment: Steal a Bit Less!" by Dario Fo, staged by Stancho Stanchev, 
"Stoyan Bachvarov" Drama Theatre – city of Varna

Monumental-decorative works

1974 Design for decorative metal grilles and ceramic panels – Dzhanavara, Varna 
1974 Mural “Harmony” in the foyer of “Chernorizets Hrabar” Primary School, Varna 
1977 Mural “Shipbuilding” – 250x500 cm – the foyer of Bulgarian Ship Hydrodynamics Centre, Varna

External links
exhibition The Daria's Cats – Second Hand
exhibition 'Paper Paintings' at the Varna City Gallery
exhibition 'Smiles and Grimaces' at the Varna City Gallery 'Boris Georgiev'
painting of Daria Vassilyanska
 SBH-Varna
bibliography – Plamena Dimitrova-Racheva
 catalogue
Balkan Quadrinnale of Painting “Myths and Legends of my People”, 2004, Stara Zagora
Public Library Varna
 Almanac "Bulgaria 20th century"
 Art Encyclopedia Varna,vol.1 
 Жената в българското изобразително изкуство – Валентин Ангелов,Университетско издателство "Св. Кирил и Методий", 2012г.,  
 Bulletin of the UBA
 DARIYA VASSILYANSKA / VISUAL CHRONICLES/bureau artrecord
 Fond of Varna City Art Gallery
 Paper Paintings – BNT
 Monograph on Daria Vassilyanska's Painting,, Compillers: Rumen Serafimov and Temenuga Stancheva,Editor: Rumen Serafimov, Graphic Design:Dimitar Traychev,Print:Helix Press - Varna 2018
 BNT 2

Contemporary painters
1928 births
Artists from Varna, Bulgaria
20th-century Bulgarian painters
2017 deaths
Bulgarian women artists
20th-century women artists